Andrafiabe is a town and commune in Madagascar. It belongs to the district of Antsiranana II, which is a part of Diana Region. According to 2001 commune census the population of Andrafiabe was 2,080.

Only primary schooling is available in town. The majority 75% of the population are farmers, while an additional 15% receives their livelihood from raising livestock. The most important crops are rice and coconut; also sugarcane is an important agricultural product. Additionally fishing employs 10% of the population.

Geography 
Andrafiabe is situated at the Route nationale 6 between Diego Suarez and Anivorano Nord.

References and notes 

Populated places in Diana Region